Shaikh Abdus Salam (born 1955) is a Bangladeshi academician, writer sports organizer and professor. He was a long time professor of Dhaka University. He is currently serving as the 13th Vice Chancellor of the Islamic University.

Early life and education 
Salam was born in 1955 in Rampal upazila of Bagerhat district. He completed his secondary education in 1970. At that time he was ranked 7th in the Jessore board . After completing his higher secondary education in 1972, he was admitted to Rajshahi University . He graduated in economics from there in 1975 and then obtained his master's degree from Dhaka University in 1976. Later in 1981 he obtained LLB degree from Dhaka University . In 1986, he obtained a PhD in mass communication and journalism from the University of Pune, India .

Career 
In 1996, Slam started his teaching career by joining Dhaka University . In 1996, he was appointed the director general of the Press Institute of Bangladesh by the Awami League government and held the post until 2001. In 2008 he was appointed chairman of the Department of Mass Communication and Journalism at Dhaka University. Then in 2009 he was appointed dean of the Faculty of Social Sciences.

Besides, from 2009 to 2011 Salam was a member of the syndicate of Bangladesh University of Business and Technology . He has been a member of the Academic Committee of Bangladesh Open University since 2011.

In a circular issued on September 29, 2020, he was appointed as the vice chancellor of the Islamic University.

Salam has served as the Chairman of the Chess and Carrom Committee of Dhaka University. In addition, he is making significant contributions to the sport of carom and disability at the national level. Salam made a significant contribution to the establishment of the Bangladesh Carrom Federation and served as its president for about 18 years from its inception (1990). He is also one of the founders of the Asian Carrom Confederation and a former member of the Media Committee of the International Carrom Federation. Salam is the President of the Bangladesh Cricket Association for Physically Challenged.

Former members of Bangladesh Chhatra League, who were working as temporary staff at the university, vandalized the officer of the personal secretary to Salam demanding their jobs be made permanent.

Publications 
Abdus Salam has written nine books. Notable among these are:

 Bangabandhu and Dhaka University . Dhaka: Ekattar Prakashani. 2017.  .
 In terms of Western research and science: Al-Quran . Dhaka: Nirnayak. 2018.  .
 Circulation of history . Dhaka: Nirnayak. 2018.  .
 Small . Dhaka: Nirnayak. 2018.  .
 People enlightened in the media and journalism of Bangladesh . Dhaka: Maula Brothers. February 5, 2011. ASIN B0083GTUU4 .
 Mass Media in Bangladesh: Newspaper, Radio and Television (in English). South Asian News Agency. January 1, 1997.  .

References 

1955 births
Living people
University of Rajshahi alumni
University of Dhaka alumni
Bangladeshi male writers
Bangladeshi educators
Bangladeshi sports executives and administrators
Vice-Chancellors of the Islamic University, Bangladesh
People from Bagerhat District
Savitribai Phule Pune University alumni